The Ghimbav is a left tributary of the river Dâmbovița in Romania. Its source is in the Leaota Mountains. It flows into the Dâmbovița upstream from Rucăr.

Tributaries

The following rivers are tributaries to the river Ghimbav (from source to mouth):

Left: Cumpărata Mare, Valea Popii, Bragadiru, Fierăria, Pârâul cu Pietriș, Plaiul, Pita
Right: Cumpărata Mică, Secăruia, Valea Andoliei, Pârâul Stânei, Pârâul Verde, Pârâul Rău, Bechet

References

Rivers of Romania
Rivers of Argeș County